The 2010 Barclays Dubai Tennis Championships was a 500 Series event on the 2010 ATP World Tour and a Premier 5 event on the 2010 WTA Tour. Both of the events took place at The Aviation Club Tennis Centre in Dubai, United Arab Emirates. The women's tournament took place from February 14 to February 20, 2010, while the men's tournament took place from February 22 to February 28, 2010 (it was planned, that the tournament would end on February 27, 2010, but due to rain the final was suspended). Novak Djokovic and Venus Williams won the singles titles.

WTA entrants

Seeds

1 Rankings as of February 8, 2010.

Other entrants
The following players received wildcards into the main draw:
 Maria Kirilenko
 Flavia Pennetta
 Selima Sfar
 Stefanie Vögele

The following players received entry from the qualifying draw:
 Chan Yung-jan
 Kirsten Flipkens
 Anna-Lena Grönefeld
 Regina Kulikova
 Ekaterina Makarova
 Vesna Manasieva
 Alicia Molik
 Anastasija Sevastova

The following player received the lucky loser spot:
  Alberta Brianti

ATP entrants

Seeds

Rankings as of February 15, 2010

Other entrants
The following players received wildcards into the main draw:
 Mohammed Ghareeb
 Rainer Schüttler
 Jo-Wilfried Tsonga

The following players received entry from the qualifying draw:
 Somdev Devvarman
 Stefan Koubek
 Igor Kunitsyn
 Björn Phau

The following player received the lucky loser spot:
  Jan Hernych

Finals

Men's singles

 Novak Djokovic defeated  Mikhail Youzhny, 7–5, 5–7, 6–3
It was Novak Djokovic's first title of the year and 17th of his career. It was his second consecutive title at the event.

Women's singles

 Venus Williams defeated  Victoria Azarenka, 6–3, 7–5
It was Venus Williams' first title of the year, 42nd title of her career, and her second consecutive title of the event.

Men's doubles

 Simon Aspelin /  Paul Hanley defeated  Lukáš Dlouhý /  Leander Paes, 6–2, 6–3

Women's doubles

 Nuria Llagostera Vives /  María José Martínez Sánchez defeated  Květa Peschke /  Katarina Srebotnik, 7–6(7–5), 6–4

References

External links
 Official website

 
2010
2010 ATP World Tour
2010 WTA Tour
February 2010 sports events in Asia